Agnieszka Radwańska was the defending champion, but lost in the semifinals to Daria Gavrilova.

Gavrilova went on to win her first WTA Tour title, defeating Dominika Cibulková in the final, 4–6, 6–3, 6–4.

Seeds
The top two seeds received a bye into the second round.

Draw

Finals

Top half

Bottom half

Qualifying

Seeds

Qualifiers

Lucky losers
  Christina McHale

Draw

First qualifier

Second qualifier

Third qualifier

Fourth qualifier

Fifth qualifier

Sixth qualifier

External links
 WTA tournament draws

Singles